A , is a type of wagashi sweet or snack with an eponymous reference to Kibi-no-kuni, an old province roughly coincident with today's Okayama Prefecture. It is made by forming gyūhi, a sort of soft mochi, into flat round cakes. Glutinous rice, starch, syrup and sugar are the basic ingredients. It is manufactured by some fifteen confectioners based in Okayama City.

The simplistic, and widely disseminated notion regarding its invention is that it was developed in the early Ansei era (ca. 1856) by the confectioner Kōeidō, but a local historian has traced a more elaborate multi-phased history in which the founding of this wagashi shop and the development of the modern recipe is pushed to a number of years later. Some hypotheses trace its pre-history to the dumpling (or some other food item) served at the Kibitsu Shrine in Okayama.

The resident deity of this shrine, Kibitsuhiko, is a legendary ogre-slayer, claimed to be the true identity of Momotarō, especially by Okayama locals. The theory originated in the 1930s, and since then there has been concerted effort in the region to promote the folk hero Momotarō as a local of Kibi Province, and his dumplings as "Kibi dango" by default.

Origins
There are irreconcilably differing accounts of the dates and sequences of events regarding the invention. The standard curt explanation is that this specialty dessert was first invented by the confectioner  during the early Ansei era (1854–). Takeda is the family name of the original business. The current proprietors give a more complex account of the first origins, but local historians uncovered an even more convoluted history.

Family's own account
The official line version, endorsed by the Kōeidō Honten, is that the family ran a ceramics merchant named "" for 7 generations running, until it switched business to that of a confectioner in 1856, changing the shop name to "Kōeidō". According to this scenario, around 1856, Takeda Hanzō (半蔵), the retired predecessor of the family ceramics shop, was one of the three Okayama townsmen who collectively devised the new recipe that was somehow an improvement over the steamed millet dumpling "rectangularly shaped like kakimochi, which did not keep well, and was eaten with red bean paste or with sauce poured on top," which was a common staple wherever the crop was harvested.

Wagashi references books
Contrary to this, a handful of desk references place "Kōeidō" already in existence at the time of c. 1856 invention, crediting the shop's first proprietor Takeda Asajirō rather than the elder Hanzō for the recipe. These sources claim that the tea ceremony connoisseur named , who was then senior advisor (karō) to the feudal lord of the local Okayama Castle (Ikeda clan), gave Asajirō crucial advise leading to the recipe innovation, and that the millet dumplings served at Kibitsu Shrine inspired hint.

But the time frame seems to be wrong. Asajirō himself wrote that during his watch, the kibi dango changed shape from the rectangular to round shapes, and this happened sometimes after the Meiji Era was ushered in (1868-). The tea ceremony expert in question, referred to in these sources as  only called himself by this art name in his retirement, from 1869 to his death in 1886.

Detailed account by local historians
More meticulous accounts of what transpired, uncovered by the labors of local historians, suggest that indeed, several years passed between 1856 and the time Asajirō became successor to this business, changing the recipe.

A detailed chronology was stitched together by local historian Oka Chōhei based on articles in print and additionally conducted interviews, is as follows:

In the year 1855 (Ansei 2) three commoners from the town around Okayama Castle (now Okayama City) collaborated and devised a reddish rectangular confection rather like kakimochi as accompaniment to serving tea. This old man Hanryo was the grandfather , and a member of the Takeda family who later founded Kōeidō. This snack was for pastime purposes only and not meant for business, but since leaving it nameless did not seem fitting, they pondered until they struck up the idea of borrowing the province name and calling it , something of a nonce word. This much is given in an article by a Meiji era popular culture researcher,  entitled .

Although this dessert was initially only distributed among friends and family, it was eventually offered for sale and gained popularity. Takeda Hanzō (died in 1901 at age 81) then outfitted a shop named  after his own art name, and had his mistress sell the Kibi-dan-go. Although Oka also heard dissenting reports that this Kibi-dan-go was millet dumpling with a "rather long thin thread of red bean paste poured over it," he was skeptical, and concluded it was in fact "probably kakimochi". After Hanzō's mistress died, the Sōkandō business was passed over to Hanzō's relative Takeda Asajirō, the founder of Kōeidō.

Asajirō's own book too states that it was only after the Meiji Restoration (1867-) that his product changed from the rectangular items of the past to the round cakes the size of two go stones, sold in boxed in sets of 30 or 50.
 
In 1885 (Meiji 18) Kōeidō's Kibi dango was presented to Emperor Meiji who was visiting the area, and he wrote a waka poem praising it, which translated to "Kibi dango such that no two such exists in Japan / Indeed such is the taste and it has earned its name, this". The sellers subsequently began to enclose leaflets with this poem printed inside its boxes.

Pre-history relating to Kibitsu Shrine

There are a number of sources attempting to trace the pre-history of the Kibi dango to some food, or custom, or legend associated with Okayama's Kibitsu Shrine, though each line of inquiry differs from one another.

As aforestated, there had been a piece of anecdote or rumor (perhaps collected in the Meiji era), claiming that the Kibi dango recipe was created on suggestion of former feudal advisor Igi San'ensai, and that he used the millet dumplings served at Kibitsu Shrine as hint.

The founder of Kōeido (the purveyors of Kibi dango) authored a travel guide in 1895, in which he claimed that Kibitsuhiko rolled with his own hand some kibi dango to give to Emperor Jimmu who stopped at Takayama Palace in Okayama. This episode is anachronistic and hence faulty, but illustrates that the manufacturer was attempting to associate their product with this deity at a relatively early juncture.

From modern academia, one theory notes that Japanese shrines have a custom called  whereby food offerings to the resident deity would afterwards be consumed. Kibitsu Shrine observed this custom in the early Edo Period, and this was the origin of the Kibi dango, according to Okayama University professor  in his book on the history of the prefecture.

Sino- and Russo-Japanese Wars
Kōeidō's Kibi dango's national fame came after the private San'yō Railway came into operation through its city. This new line connected the Kobe (which was the terminus of the state-run line) to Okayama in 1891, and extended the line to Hiroshima just before the Sino-Japanese War broke out in 1894. Those residing farther east and serving the war by necessity rode the San'yō line, and passed the Okayama station in transit. Kōeidō, which been peddling their goods in Okayama Station now expanded business to the Hiroshima Station, and capitalized on the soldiers and send-off parties buying the Kibi dango as souvenirs.

It was at this time that Kōeidō began its marketing strategy connecting its product to "Peach Boy". Reputedly, proprietor Takeda Asajirō himself dressed up as Momotarō and held up the "Nippon-ichi (number one in Japan)" banner to pitch sales, and persons dressed up as oni ogre handed out leaflets. The peddling at the station was so successful, that a lady from Yamawaki (Sangetsudō), who also had Takeda Hanzō connections, was recruited to help. By April 1897 (Meiji 30), there were 12 establishments that billed themselves as the "original" Kibi dango sellers.

A 1901 article by folk historian  stated that while "Kōeidō used millet, mochi, and sugar as ingredients, Sangetsudō used mochi and sugar," and that Sangetsudō stressed the fact they did not use millet and was different item than "Japan's number one kibi dango."

Modern age
As already described, during the Meiji Era, the Kibi dango business had already appropriated the "number one" slogan from the  Peach Boy folktale, and was using the hero's costume to promote sales. But eventually, the entire Okayama prefecture began to promote the Kibi dango and Momotarō as inextricably connected part of their prefectural heritage. This was mostly a post-World War II phenomenon, Okayama had not been the foremost contender as the home of the Peach Boy (Inuyama, Aichi and Kinashi in Takamatsu on Shikoku previously laying strong claims). However, that changed with the advent of amateur ethnographer  (1897-1973),  ("The True History of Momotarō," 1930), which claimed that the Momotarō folktale was an adaption of legend , which recounts Kibitsuhiko's suppression of a local oni (ogre) named . This ogre-slayer Kibitsuhiko, as his name suggests, is the deified being venerated in Kibitsu Shrine, Okayama.

Nowadays, the Momotarō theme is used in train station advertisement, as well as being found in packaging of the kibi dango products. Since 1993, the Kōeidō Honten has sold the "Ganso Kibidango", featuring Momotarō character design by children's book illustrator Tarō Gomi.

See also

 Doraemon (comic) -  is one of the 
 Kibitsuhiko-no-mikoto
 List of dumplings
 Momotarō
 
  - another Okayama city confection
 Proso millet

Footnotes

Explanatory notes

Citations

References

External Link 
Koeido Takeda

Dumplings
Wagashi